On 15 and 18 March 2016, Belgian police carried out raids on houses in Brussels. The raids were conducted in connection to the attacks in Paris four months earlier. In the raids, one suspect was killed and five others were arrested, including Salah Abdeslam, who is suspected of direct involvement in the Paris attacks.

Raids

15 March
Police carried out a raid on a house in Forest, a municipality of Brussels. A police statement said that the raid was related to the November 2015 Paris attacks. The house was situated in the Rue du Dries/Driesstraat, near the Audi factory in Forest. Four police officers, one of them French, were wounded in the raid. One suspect was killed, and a manhunt began for two other suspects.

The suspect killed was identified by Belgian police as Mohamed Belkaid, a 35-year-old Algerian citizen. Belkaid immigrated to and lived for several years in Sweden, where he married a Swedish woman who was fifteen years older than him. During this period, he was sent to prison four times. In 2014, he traveled to Syria to commit jihad. Belkaid is believed to have been an associate of Salah Abdeslam, a suspected accomplice in the Paris attacks. He was killed after being shot by a police sniper, but not before his actions allowed Abdeslam and another suspect to escape through the rooftops.

Two other suspects, brothers Ibrahim and Khalid El Bakraoui, evaded capture during the raid. They committed suicide bombings in Brussels a week later, on 22 March.

It was reported that an ISIS flag and Salafist literature were found in the flat, together with a Kalashnikov rifle and ammunition. Also found were detonators that investigators now believe were intended to be used during 22 March bombings in Brussels.

18 March
On 18 March, Belgian prosecutors stated that Abdeslam's fingerprints had been found in the Forest flat. Later that day, there were reports of further raids, and the sound of gunfire, in the Molenbeek area of Brussels. Two suspects, identified as Abdeslam and Monir Ahmed Alaaj, were reportedly injured in one such raid. Five people, including Abdeslam, were arrested during the raid. On 16 April, the Interior Minister of Belgium, Jan Jambon, stated that protesters "threw stones and bottles at police and press" during Abdeslam's arrest.

Another suspect, identified as 24-year-old Belgian citizen Najim Laachraoui, had not been caught yet. He committed a suicide bombing in Brussels a week later, on 22 March.

Suspicion was apparently aroused to Abdeslam's location after a person in the flat made an unusually large pizza order. When officers arrived at the scene, they found the woman who made the food order with two other adults, children, and Abdeslam. Police later announced that they were also led to Abdeslam's location after he phoned an associate they were monitoring, following his escape on 15 March. Earlier, in December 2015, a police dossier was made containing information about a suspected radicalized person living in the flat. However, it was not passed to the relevant authority because, according to the Mechelen chief of police, the person responsible forgot to do so.

Reactions
In the wake of the raid, French President François Hollande called Abdeslam's arrest "an important moment". French Prime Minister Manuel Valls also welcomed Abdeslam's arrest and added that more work needed to be done in tracking down terrorist cells in Europe.

In July 2016, IS released a video celebrating several terrorist attacks that took place during the month of Ramadan showing Abu Idris al-Baljiki, and Mohamed Belkaid and displaying his nom de guerre Abu Abdul-Aziz Al-Jazairi.

See also
 2015 Saint-Denis raid
 2016 Brussels bombings
 Brussels lockdown
 January 2015 anti-terrorism operations in Belgium

References 

Police
2016 in Brussels
Counterterrorism in Belgium
Islamic State of Iraq and the Levant and Belgium
March 2016 events in Europe
2016
Police raids on Islamists
Islamic terrorism in Belgium